A defunct Islamist Coalition was formed in February 2013 by hardline Islamist parties in Egypt.

Formerly affiliated parties
Islamic Party
Building and Development Party
Egyptian Nation Party
People Party
Hazemon

References

Defunct political party alliances in Egypt
Organizations established in 2013